Zoya Sawleha is a 2017 Pakistani drama serial directed by Najaf Bilgrami, produced by Babar Javed and written by Madiha Shahid. The drama stars Madiha Imam, Nausheen Shah and Wahaj Ali in lead roles, and first aired on 4 July 2017 on Geo Entertainment continuing every Monday and Tuesday at 10:00 P.M.

Plot
Zoya Sualiha is about a widow named Asmat and her two daughters, Shahwaar and Zoya. She is worried about Shahwaar whose age is around 35 and no one wants to marry her due to the family's poor finances. Zoya wants to be a lawyer in order to reclaim their occupied property back from their uncle (Taya) who by injustice stole their inheritance and made them leave the house after his brother's death. Zoya starts her law study, while her taya threatens her not to study law but she continues in spite of all menaces.

Zoya becomes engaged to her cousin Daniyal but his mother opposes the marriage as beneath his class. She forces Daniyal to break up with Zoya and tells her niece Mehreen (Benita David) to marry Daniyal in order to gain her money. Daniyal unhappily marries Mehreen while Zoya concentrates on her studies. Faris, Zoya's classmate, proposes marriage to her. Taya's son Adil secretly marries Shahwaar against his father's will.
 
Zoya, after completing her study, files a case against her uncle, and wins after Adil gives witness against his father. Asmat with her daughters reclaims her house while Taya asks them for forgiveness. Faris marries Zoya while Mehreen shows her true colors to Daniyal's parents and they are ashamed of their previous marriage plan.

Cast
Madiha Imam as Zoya Sawleha
Wahaj Ali as Faris
Nausheen Shah as Shahwaar
Ali Safina as Adil
Farzana Thaheem as Asmat
Basit Faryad
Beenita David as Mehreen
Ramsha Khan
Manzoor Qureshi
Adnan Jilani
Shahzadi Jasmin
Annie Zaidi as Malaika
Shahzad Raza as Asmat's Brother

References

Pakistani drama television series
Geo TV original programming
2017 Pakistani television series debuts
Urdu-language television shows